The 2012 CAF Champions League Final was the final of the 2012 CAF Champions League, the 48th edition of Africa's premier club football tournament organized by the Confederation of African Football (CAF), and the 16th edition under the current CAF Champions League format.

The final was played between Al Ahly from Egypt and ES Tunis from Tunisia. Al Ahly won 3–2 on aggregate (first leg: 1–1; second leg: 2–1) to win a record seventh title. As the winner of the 2012 CAF Champions League, they qualified for the 2012 FIFA Club World Cup as the African representative, as well as participating in the 2013 CAF Super Cup against the winner of the 2012 CAF Confederation Cup.

Qualified teams

Road to the final

Notes
† The match between Espérance and Étoile du Sahel on Matchday 4 was abandoned due to crowd disturbance. The CAF decided to disqualify Étoile du Sahel as a result and all results obtained previously by them within Group A were cancelled.

Format
The final is decided over two legs, with aggregate goals used to determine the winner. If the sides are level on aggregate after the second leg, the away goals rule applied, and if still level, the tie proceed directly to a penalty shootout (no extra time is played).

First leg

Second leg

References

External links
CAF Champions League

2012
Final
Al Ahly SC matches
Espérance ST matches
Sports competitions in Radès
21st century in Radès